South Plantation High School is a four-year public high school located in the city of Plantation, Florida in the United States.

SPHS is part of the Broward County Public Schools school district, which is the sixth-largest district in the nation with over 258,000 students enrolled as of the 2007/08 school year. The school was named a Blue Ribbon School of Excellence in 1982 and 1983. South Plantation had an FCAT school grade of "A" for the 2010–11 academic year. 

South Plantation High School operates an environmental science magnet program, which allows students living outside of the school's boundaries to attend.

Demographics
As of the 2021-22 school year, the total student enrollment was 2,275. The ethnic makeup of the school was 21.4% Non-Hispanic White, 39.5% Black, 32.6% Hispanic, 2.4% Asian, 3.6% Multiracial, 0.8% Native American or Native Alaskan, and 0.4% Native Hawaiian or Pacific Islander.

Attendance zone
The school serves sections of Plantation, Broadview Park, Fort Lauderdale and Davie. The magnet school serves students from anywhere in the BCPS school district.

Notable alumni
Robby Anderson, NFL wide receiver for the Arizona Cardinals
Richard Bleier (born 1987), Major League Baseball pitcher with the Boston Red Sox
Jay Burna, hip hop & pop artist, songwriter
Benjamin Crump, attorney specializing in civil rights and catastrophic personal injury cases 
Colin Cole, former NFL player 
Chris Cote, podcaster and Internet personality on The Dan Le Batard Show with Stugotz
Alex Collins, NFL player (free agent)
Reggie Cross, former basketball player
Erin DiMeglio, first female Florida high school quarterback
Wayne Federman, comedian, film and television actor, author
John Franklin III, NFL wide receiver for Memphis Showboats
Zane Hijazi, podcaster and Internet personality
Heath Hussar, podcaster and Internet personality
Marc Kudisch (born 1966), Broadway actor
Andrew Mayne, television personality (Don't Trust Andrew Mayne, Shark Week), WSJ best-selling novelist
Donna Pastore, professor, collegiate softball coach and player, University of Florida Hall of Fame
Alfredo Roberts, former NFL player
Ricco Ross, film and television actor
Justin Robert Young, podcaster and Internet personality

References

External links
South Plantation High School

Broward County Public Schools
Magnet schools in Florida
High schools in Broward County, Florida
Public high schools in Florida
1971 establishments in Florida
Educational institutions established in 1971
Plantation, Florida